Stow is a hamlet in Chautauqua County, New York, United States. The community is located along the western shore of Chautauqua Lake; a ferry connects it to Bemus Point on the eastern shore. Stow has a post office with ZIP code 14785, which opened on December 6, 1880.

References

Hamlets in Chautauqua County, New York
Hamlets in New York (state)